The Trans Euro Trail or TET is a roughly 38000km GPX adventure motorcycle backpacking route through 
Europe. The Trail contains all kinds of unpaved trails which are officially allowed according to the local laws and regulations of the relevant
countries.

Organisation 
The TET was founded by John Ross and has been available since 2017.

So called "Linesmen" keep the GPX tracks in their countries up to date with the assistance of everyone that rides the Trail and of the communities which the trail passes through.

Route 
The TET route has two arms:

 Western (Sweden, Norway, Denmark, Germany, Switzerland, Low Countries, UK, France, Andorra, Spain and Portugal)
 Eastern (Finland, the Baltic states, Poland, Ukraine, Romania,  Serbia, Bulgaria, Greece, the Balkans and Italy)

Code of Conduct 
There is a Code of Conduct translated into all the European languages and a central ethos of
   Respect for the Trails
   Respect for the Communities we travel through
   Respect for the Environment

Publishing the TET is a not for profit Community Interest Company (CIC). The Trail and the logo are trademarked for protection of 
hijacking and misuse.

The track is available for free and at no cost.

The TET was inspired by the Trans America Trail (TAT).

Weblinks 
 Home - Trans Euro Trail
 TET CIC goals and aims
 Trans Euro Trail | Experiences | Motorcyclenews.com

See also 
 Trans America Trail

References

Off-roading
Backpacking